The 1991 Champion Hurdle was a horse race held at Cheltenham Racecourse on Tuesday 12 March 1991. It was the 62nd running of the Champion Hurdle.

The winner was Michael Jackson's Morley Street, a seven-year-old chestnut gelding trained in Hampshire by Toby Balding and ridden by Jimmy Frost. Morley Street's victory was a first in the race for jockey and owner, and a second for the trainer, who had previously won with Beech Road in 1989.

Morley Street had established himself as a top class hurdler by winning the Mersey Novices' Hurdle in 1989 and the Aintree Hurdle in 1990, but had had mixed results when campaigned in steeplechases in the early part of the 1990/1991 National Hunt season. He re-entered the Champion Hurdle picture by winning the Berkshire Hurdle at Newbury on 1 March. Eleven days later he started the 4/1 favourite for the Champion Hurdle and won by one and a half lengths from the American-bred stallion Nomadic Way, with Ruling a head away in third place. The previous winner of the race to take part was Beech Road who finished in eighth place. Twenty-one of the twenty-four runners completed the course.

Race details
 Sponsor: Smurfit
 Purse: £136,592; First prize: £81,790
 Going: Good to Soft
 Distance: 2 miles
 Number of runners: 24
 Winner's time: 3m 54.80

Full result

 Abbreviations: nse = nose; nk = neck; hd = head; dist = distance; UR = unseated rider; PU = pulled up; LFT = left at start; SU = slipped up; BD = brought down

Winner's details
Further details of the winner, Morley Street
 Sex: Gelding
 Foaled: 19 May 1984
 Country: United Kingdom
 Sire: Deep Run; Dam: High Board (High Line)
 Owner: Michael Jackson Bloodstock
 Breeder: M Parkhill

References

Champion Hurdle
1991
Champion Hurdle
1990s in Gloucestershire
Champion Hurdle